Konstantinos Lymberakis (born 31 October 1942 is a sailor from Greece, who represented his country at the 1976 Summer Olympics in Kingston, Ontario, Canada as crew member in the Soling. With helmsman George Andreadis and fellow crew member Georgios Perrakis, they took the 14th place. He also competed in the Flying Dutchman event at the 1960 Summer Olympics.

References

Sources
 

1942 births
Living people
Greek male sailors (sport)
Sailors at the 1960 Summer Olympics – Flying Dutchman
Sailors at the 1976 Summer Olympics – Soling
Olympic sailors of Greece